The 1951 Richmond Trophy was a non-championship Formula One motor race held at the Goodwood Circuit on 26 March 1951.

Classification

Race

References

Richmond Trophy
Richmond Trophy
Richmond Trophy